Soy tu dueña (Literal English translation: I’m your owner, International English title: A Woman of Steel) is a Mexican telenovela produced by Nicandro Díaz González for Televisa. It is a remake of the telenovela La Dueña, produced in 1995. 

Lucero and Fernando Colunga star as protagonists, while Gabriela Spanic, Sergio Goyri and the leading actress Jacqueline Andere star as antagonists. David Zepeda, Marisol del Olmo, Fabián Robles, Eduardo Capetillo and the leading actors Ana Martín, Julio Alemán, Eric del Castillo, José Carlos Ruiz and Silvia Pinal star as stellar performances. 

This was Colunga’s second collaboration on-screen with Spanic, since 1998's La Usurpadora and his third collaboration with Lucero, after 2005’s Alborada and 2009’s Mañana es para siempre.

Univision introduced Soy tu dueña in the United States because Corazón salvaje, broadcast weeknights at 9pm/8c, was the least watched telenovela during prime time. It was broadcast from June 1 to December 27, 2010, becoming the most watched telenovela during the 9pm time slot. The last episode was broadcast on December 27, 2010 with Triunfo del amor replacing it  on January 3, 2011.

Plot 
Valentina Villalba Rangel (Lucero) is a successful businesswoman and the heiress of a great fortune that her parents left to her upon their untimely death during Valentina’s childhood.  Valentina has been raised by her aunt, Isabel Rangel (Silvia Pinal).  She lives in a beautiful mansion in Mexico City with her aunt, her cousin, Ivana Dorantes Rangel (Gabriela Spanic), and her faithful nanny since her birth, Benita Garrido (Ana Martín).  Valentina is a generous woman who shares her fortune and home with her aunt and cousin.  But Ivana, Isabel’s only child, is consumed with envy and jealousy toward Valentina and believes she deserves everything her cousin has. 
 
Valentina is in love with and engaged to marry Alonso Peñalvert (David Zepeda).  Unbeknownst to Valentina, Ivana and Alonso are having a secret affair and are conspiring to rob Valentina of all she possesses.  At the same time, Alonso is unaware that Ivana has an additional lover, Oscar Ampudia (Claudio Baez), who is married.  Just prior to Valentina’s wedding day, Ivana runs over Oscar with his car and kills him.

Alonso stands Valentina up at the altar of the church on their wedding day but does not escape with Ivana as they had planned. Instead he flees Mexico and the loan sharks to whom he is deeply indebted.  Devastated over Alonso’s betrayal, and unaware of Ivana and Alonso’s secret relationship and also of Ivana’s affair with Oscar Ampudia, Valentina changes from a sweet, fair, kind,  and sensible woman into a cold, authoritarian, 
bitter, and despotic woman. She swears never to fall in love again and decides to isolate herself at her family’s hacienda, “Los Cascabeles”, where she intends to live while managing the hacienda.  At “Los Cascabeles” and the neighboring community she becomes known to all as “La Vibora", Spanish for viper or snake, due to her implacable and cold-hearted personality.

There she meets her neighbor, José Miguel Montesinos (Fernando Colunga), an attractive, intelligent, sensitive man who immediately falls in love with her beauty and strong personality.  With his father and mother, Federico (Eric del Castillo) and Leonor Montesinos (Jacqueline Andere), José Miguel has relocated from Mexico City to his family’s rundown and neglected hacienda due to his father’s poor health.  Despite the poor financial state in which his family finds itself, and against his mother’s wishes, José Miguel is determined to make the hacienda profitable as it was during his youth and a haven for his sick father.

Valentina’s aunt, cousin, and nanny decide to join Valentina at “Los Cascabeles”.  Thus begins a story of lies, deceptions, duplicity, and treachery in which José Miguel must fight for Valentina and for her love against not only Ivana (who has fallen in love with José Miguel) but also against the wishes of his own mother and Valentina’s ranch foreman, Rosendo Gavilán (Sergio Goyri) (who has fallen in love with Valentina). Additionally, José Miguel must fight Alonso Peñalvert who has returned and comes to “Los Cascabeles” to convince Valentina of his love and to win her back.

Cast

Main
 Lucero as Valentina Villalba de Montesinos 
 Fernando Colunga as José Miguel Montesinos
 Gabriela Spanic as Ivana Dorantes
 Sergio Goyri as Rosendo Gavilán
 Eduardo Capetillo as Horacio Acosta
 Jacqueline Andere as Leonor de Montesinos
 Ana Martín as Benita Garrido
 Silvia Pinal as Isabel Rangel Vda. de Dorantes

Also main

 David Zepeda as Alonso Peñalvert
 Julio Alemán as Ernesto Galeana
 Carlos Bracho as Father Justino #1
 Arsenio Campos as Father Justino #2
 Eric del Castillo as Federico Montesinos
 José Carlos Ruiz  as Don Sabino Mercado
 Marisol del Olmo as Gabriela Islas
 Fabián Robles as Felipe Santibáñez
 Ana Bertha Espín as Enriqueta Bermúdez de Macotela
 David Ostrosky as Moisés Macotela
 Rossana San Juan as Crisanta Camargo
 Fátima Torre as Iluminada Camargo 
 Cristina Obregon as Sandra Enriqueta Macotela Bermúdez
 Paul Stanley as Timoteo
 Mario del Río as Filadelfo Porras 
 Claudia Ortega as Teresa de Granados 
 Eduardo Rivera as Juan Granados
 Diego Ávila as Chuy Granados 
 Vicente Herrera as Dante Espíndola
 Tony Vela as Comandante Bruno Toledo 
 Myrrah Saavedra as Leonela Lagunes de Castaño
 Diana Osorio as Margarita Corona 
 Alejandra Procuna as Brenda Castaño Lagunés
 Anabel Ferreira as Amparo
 Tony Bravo as Evelio Zamarripa / Úrsulo Barragán

Special participation
 Claudio Báez as Óscar Ampudia
 Emoé de la Parra as Narda de Ampudia
 Gerardo Albarrán as Nerón Almoguera
 Martha Julia as Dama de honor
 Marisol Santacruz as Cecilia Rangel de Villalba
 Guillermo Capetillo as Rogelio Villalba
 Raúl Padilla "Chóforo" as Father Ventura
 Alejandro Ruiz as Nazario Melgarejo
 Juan Carlos Serrán as Librado Manzanares
 Aurora Clavel as Doña Angustias
 Pilar Montenegro as Arcelia Olivares
 Eduardo Rodríguez as Dr. Esteban Noguera

Awards and nominations

References

External links 

2010 telenovelas
2010 Mexican television series debuts
2010 Mexican television series endings
Mexican telenovelas
Televisa telenovelas
Television series reboots
Spanish-language telenovelas